|}

The El Gran Senor Stakes is a Listed flat horse race in Ireland open to thoroughbreds aged two years only. It is run at Tipperary over a distance of 7 furlongs and 100 yards (1,513 metres), and it is scheduled to take place each year in August.

The race was first run in 2003 as the El Gran Senor Stakes.  However, as is the case for the Tipperary Stakes, the name is regularly changed to advertise one of the Coolmore Stud stallions.  Churchill has been the beneficiary since 2020, preceded by Caravaggio (2018-19), Ivawood (2017), Canford Cliffs (2012-2016), Hurricane Run (2008-2011) and Ad Valorem (2007).

Records
Leading jockey (4 wins):
 Colin Keane – Convergence (2014), Waipu Cove (2015), Justifier (2019), Hellsing (2022)

Leading trainer (6 wins):
 Aidan O'Brien – ''Westphalia (2008), Viscount Nelson (2009), Indian Maharaja (2013), Capri (2016), Ballet Shoes (2017), Christmas (2018)'

Winners

See also
 Horse racing in Ireland
 List of Irish flat horse races

References
Racing Post: 

Flat races in Ireland
Tipperary Racecourse
Flat horse races for two-year-olds
Recurring sporting events established in 2003
2003 establishments in Ireland